The fourth Minnesota Legislature first convened on January 7, 1862. The half of the 21 members of the Minnesota Senate who represented even-numbered districts were elected during the General Election of November 6, 1860, while the 42 members of the Minnesota House of Representatives and the other half of the members of the Minnesota Senate were elected during the General Election of October 8, 1861.

Sessions 
The legislature met in a regular session from January 7, 1862 to March 7, 1862. A special session of the legislature was convened from September 9, 1862 to September 29, 1862 in response to the Dakota War of 1862, to consider such matters as suffrage for military personnel, the organization and equipment of the militia, and regulations concerning the sale of alcoholic beverages to Native Americans.

Party summary 
Resignations and new members are discussed in the "Membership changes" section, below.

Senate

House of Representatives

Leadership

Senate 
Lieutenant Governor
Ignatius L. Donnelly (R-Nininger)

House of Representatives 
Speaker of the House
Jared Benson (R-Anoka)

Members

Senate

House of Representatives

Membership changes

Senate

Notes

References 

 Minnesota Legislators Past & Present - Session Search Results (Session 4, Senate)
 Minnesota Legislators Past & Present - Session Search Results (Session 4, House)

04th
1860s in Minnesota